Mouse-ear tickseed is a common name for several plants and may refer to:

Coreopsis auriculata
Coreopsis integrifolia